William Albert Lunn (17 September 1926 – 22 December 1996), commonly known as Bert Lunn or Bill Lunn, was a New Zealand rugby union player.

Lunn played 47 first class games, of which all but six were for Otago.  A flanker, he played in two matches for the New Zealand national side, the All Blacks, both of them tests against the touring Australian team in 1949.

References 

1926 births
1996 deaths
Lincoln University (New Zealand) alumni
New Zealand international rugby union players
New Zealand rugby union players
Otago rugby union players
Rugby union flankers
Rugby union players from Alexandra, New Zealand